The Nicobar Island keelback (Hebius nicobariensis) is a species of colubrid snake. It is endemic to the Nicobar Islands of India.

References

Further reading
Sclater, W.L. 1891. Notes on a Collection of Snakes in the Indian Museum, with descriptions of several new species. J. Asiat. Soc. Bengal LX: 230-250. ("Tropidonotus nicobarensis [sic], sp. nov.", pp. 241–242 & Plate VI, figures 5a., 5b., 5c., 5d.)

Hebius
Reptiles of India
Endemic fauna of the Nicobar Islands
Taxa named by William Lutley Sclater
Reptiles described in 1891